The Two of Them is a feminist science fiction novel by Joanna Russ. It was first published in 1978 in the United States by Berkley Books and in Great Britain by The Women's Press in 1986. It was last reissued in 2005 by the Wesleyan University Press with a foreword by Sarah LeFanu.

Plot
Irene, a female galactic agent, rescues a young woman, Zubeydeh, from a male-dominant culture of a colonized planet, Ala-ed-deen, where women are kept in purdah.

Background
This novel uses characters and a setting from Suzette Haden Elgin's short story "For The Sake Of Grace," with Elgin's permission.  Russ discloses this in the novel's dedication page.

References
Notes

Bibliography

 Clute, John and Peter Nicholls. The Encyclopedia of Science Fiction. New York: St. Martin's Griffin, 1993 (2nd edition 1995). .
 Cortiel, Jeanne. "Demand My Writing: Joanna Russ/Feminism/Science Fiction" in Science Fiction Texts and Studies. Liverpool, UK: Liverpool University Press, 1999. pp. 64–70, 104-121. .
 Spencer, Kathleen L. "Rescuing the Female Child: The Fiction of Joanna Russ" Science Fiction Studies 17.2 (1990): pp. 167–187.

External links
 
 

1978 American novels
1978 science fiction novels
American science fiction novels
Feminist science fiction novels
Berkley Books books
Works by Joanna Russ